The 2018 GP Nacional 2 de Portugal (Portuguese: 2018 Grande Prémio de Portugal Nacional 2) was the first edition of the GP Nacional 2 de Portugal cycle race and was held from 18 July to 22 July 2018 as part of the 2018 UCI Europe Tour; it was categorised as a 2.2 race.

The race was won by Raúl Alarcón, riding for the  team.  However, in March 2021, due to doping all his results obtained between July 28, 2015 and October 21, 2019, were cancelled, including 2018 Volta a Portugal.

Teams 

The 20 teams invited to the race were:

Stages

Classification leadership 

 In stage two, David de la Fuente, who was second in the points classification, wore the green jersey, because first placed Raúl Alarcón wore the yellow jersey as leader of the general classification.
 In stage two, João Rodrigues, who was second in the mountains classification, wore the blue jersey, because first placed Raúl Alarcón wore the yellow jersey as leader of the general classification.
 In stage two, Rui Vinhas, who was second in the best sprints classification, wore the white jersey, because first placed Raúl Alarcón wore the yellow jersey as leader of the general classification.
 In stage three, João Rodrigues, who was second in the mountains classification, wore the blue jersey, because first placed Raúl Alarcón wore the yellow jersey as leader of the general classification.
 In stage four, João Rodrigues, who was second in the mountains classification, wore the blue jersey, because first placed Raúl Alarcón wore the yellow jersey as leader of the general classification.
 In stage five, João Rodrigues, who was second in the mountains classification, wore the blue jersey, because first placed Raúl Alarcón wore the yellow jersey as leader of the general classification.

Final standings

General classification

Points classification

Mountains classification

Sprints classification

Young rider classification

Team classification

References

External links 
 

GP de Portugal Nacional 2
GP de Portugal Nacional 2